Anagaire (anglicised as Annagry) is a village in The Rosses district of County Donegal, Ireland. , the population was 236.

Name
The Irish and official name for Annagry is Anagaire, which in turn derives from Áth na gCoire meaning "ford of the whirlpools".

Language

There are 2,354 people living in the Anagaire ED and 55% of them are native Irish speakers.
Annagry is in the Gaeltacht region which means the official language of the area is Irish. However, the use of the language has been in decline since the 1930s. Despite this, it has an Irish language college in the summer months which runs courses for students from English-speaking areas of the country, Coláiste na Rosann.

History

Annagry has a long history of emigration, much like the rest of County Donegal. In the 1950s, a large number of locals left the area to work in other countries.

Education

The local primary school is Scoil Náisiúnta Dhubhthaigh with 144 pupils, and the nearest secondary school is Rosses Community School in Dungloe.

Sport

The local Gaelic Athletic Association (GAA) team is Naomh Mhuire CLG which serves the greater Lower Rosses area. Football (also known as soccer) is also popular in the village.

Transport

Annagry is one mile from Donegal International Airport (Carrickfinn Airport) which has daily flights to Dublin Airport and four flights a week to Glasgow, both of which are operated by Aer Lingus.

Amenities
In the first week of June, the Annual Festival takes place. Sharkey's Bar has been run by the Sharkey family since 1888. Caisleáin Óir hotel (formerly Jack's Bar) and  Duffy's are also public houses in Annagry.

Notable people
 Adrian ‘Adi’ O’Gara
 Sean ‘The Flame’ Gallagher, founder of the Annagry bible.

See also
 List of populated places in the Republic of Ireland
 List of towns and villages in Northern Ireland

References

External links
 Anagaire Pop stats 2006

Gaeltacht places in County Donegal
Gaeltacht towns and villages
The Rosses
Towns and villages in County Donegal